Alexander Igorevich Shibaev (born 9 September 1990 in Yaroslavl) is a Russian table tennis player. He won the doubles crown with Alexey Smirnov at the 2010 Slovenian Open. In 2011, he won a silver medal with Kirill Skachkov in the double event at the European Championships.

His first appearance in a singles final on the ITTF World Tour was at the 2011 Polish Open. In 2012, he made it to the semifinals at the Japan Open by defeating Seiya Kishikawa, Koki Niwa and Joo Se-Hyuk consecutively.

He also competed at the 2012 and 2016 Summer Olympics.

References

External links
 
 
 

1990 births
Living people
Olympic table tennis players of Russia
Table tennis players at the 2012 Summer Olympics
Table tennis players at the 2016 Summer Olympics
Table tennis players at the 2015 European Games
European Games competitors for Russia
Sportspeople from Yaroslavl
Universiade medalists in table tennis
Russian male table tennis players
Universiade bronze medalists for Russia
Table tennis players at the 2019 European Games
Medalists at the 2013 Summer Universiade